Sumerlin are an American Christian rock band from Wilmington, North Carolina. The band is currently composed of Dan DiGiovanni, Logan Tudor, Chris Taylor, and Joshua Mace.

History
The band formed in 2009, however their first release was 2010's, Forfeit the Compass EP. Two years later, the group released, Motives EP, through Mosaic Artistry. Their first ever Billboard charting was for "Just a Dream" that reached No. 14 on the Christian Rock songs chart. This EP would see the band chart "The Fallback", their second single, on the Christian Rock songs chart at a peak of No. 2. Their debut studio album with Dream Records was released on February 4, 2014, Runaways. This debut album saw the band chart twice more on the Christian Rock songs chart with "Breaking Out" at No. 1 and "Heartbeat" at No. 6. The group released the deluxe edition of this album on February 15, 2015, and its first single "Out of My Head" has currently reach a peak of No. 7 on the Christian Rock songs chart.

Members
 Dan DiGiovanni – lead vocals, Dan is also the worship and creative director for Rock Church in Wilmington, NC rockchurch.cc
 Logan Tudor – guitar
 Chris Taylor – bass, backing vocals
 Joshua Mace – drums

Discography
Albums
 Runaways, Dream Records (2014)
 Runaways: Deluxe Edition, Dream Records (2015)

EPs
 Forfeit the Compass, Independent (2010)
 Motives, Independent (2012)

Singles

References

American Christian rock groups
Musical groups established in 2009
Musical groups from North Carolina
2009 establishments in North Carolina